Patu digua is a very small species of spider. The male holotype and female paratype were collected from Río Digua, near Queremal, Valle del Cauca, in Colombia.

By some accounts it is the smallest spider in the world, as males reach a body size of only about —roughly one fifth the size of the head of a pin.

References

Symphytognathidae
Spiders of South America
Arthropods of Colombia
Spiders described in 1977
Taxa named by Norman I. Platnick
Taxa named by Raymond Robert Forster